Lajehi (also Romanized as Lajeh’ī; also known as Deh-e Lajī and Deh-e Qezelbāsh) is a village in Jahanabad Rural District, in the Central District of Hirmand County, Sistan and Baluchestan Province, Iran. At the 2006 census, its population was 42, in 9 families.

References 

Populated places in Hirmand County